The Sky Is Crying may refer to:

"The Sky Is Crying" (song), a blues song by Elmore James recorded by many artists
The Sky Is Crying (album), a 1991 album by Stevie Ray Vaughan and Double Trouble
The Sky Is Crying (Erja Lyytinen album), a 2014 album by Erja Lyytinen